The principle of abstraction is a grouping principle, whereby a hierarchy is adhered to with higher levels of abstraction placed near the top with more specific concepts underneath.

Example 
For the teaching (not personnel) organization of a university the levels of abstraction would go something like this:

University
→ Faculty of Science
— Department of Physics
– Subject: Physics 101
• Topic: Fluid dynamics
— Department of Earth Sciences
— Department of Biology
→ Faculty of Arts
— Department of History
– Subject: Australian History
• Topic: 1850-1854 Victorian Gold rush
— Department of Philosophy
— Department of Literature
→ Faculty of Medicine
— Department of Immunology
— Department of Neurosurgery
— Department of Endocrinology

Grouping
 Hierarchy